The .458 HAM'R is a large bore, centerfire rifle cartridge, designed for use in AR-15 style rifles.  Wilson Combat, owned by Bill Wilson (developer of .458 HAM'R), sells a .458 HAM'R chambered, AR-style firearm named the WC-12, which is between the sizes of the AR-10 and AR-15 platforms.  AR-10 platforms with lowers that accept an AR-15 cartridge can also safely fire the .458 HAM'R.  

It is very similar to the .458 SOCOM, specialized to operate at higher pressure, offering an increased range in a flatter trajectory.  The cartridge uses an AR-15 sized magazine, but the cartridge pressures require a bolt, barrel, and receiver designed for the pressure of the AR-10 platform.

Designer
Bill Wilson of Wilson Combat designed the cartridge.

See also
 List of rifle cartridges
List of AR platform cartridges

References

Pistol and rifle cartridges